Sagittaria montevidensis is a species of flowering plant in the water-plantain family Alismataceae. Common names include giant arrowhead and California arrowhead.

Description
Sagittaria montevidensis is a robust, stemless, rhizomatous, aquatic plant. The young ribbon-like leaves grow submerged, while the leaves of older plants emerge above the water surface. The leaves are sagitatte and glabrous, up to 28 centimeters long and 23 centimeters wide.

Inflorescences are typically shorter than the leaves and decumbent. Flowers are in whorls or pairs at nodes and have a diameter of two to three centimeters.. They have three petals, each of which is white with a striking wine-colored stain, and three green sepals. Flowering occurs from June to September.

Distribution
Sagittaria montevidensis is widespread in wetlands of North America (United States, Canada, Mexico) and South America (Brazil, Bolivia,  Ecuador, Peru, Argentina, Chile, Paraguay, Uruguay). In North America, the distribution is disjunct, primarily in a wide area from West Virginia to Texas to South Dakota, but with isolated occurrences in New Brunswick, Maine, Connecticut, New York, New Jersey, California, Florida and Alabama It is reportedly naturalized in Spain, Tanzania, and the Island of Java in Indonesia.

Habitat
It grows preferentially at the edges of ponds, in  shallow and often only temporarily existing waters.

Subspecies
 Sagittaria montevidensis subsp. calycina (Engelm.) Bogin (syn. Sagittaria calycina Engelm.) – United States, Mexico
 Sagittaria montevidensis subsp. montevidensis – South America
 Sagittaria montevidensis subsp. spongiosa (syn. Sagittaria calycina var. spongiosa Engelm., Lophotocarpus spongiosus (Engelm.) J.G.Sm.) – Mid-Atlantic and Northeastern United States, New Brunswick in Canada

References

External links

montevidensis
Plants described in 1827
Flora of New Brunswick
Flora of Mexico
Flora of South America
Flora of the United States
Flora of Canada
Flora of Brazil
Flora of Bolivia
Flora of Tanzania
Flora of Java
Flora of Spain
Flora of Ecuador
Flora of Peru
Flora of Argentina
Flora of Chile
Flora of Paraguay
Flora of Coahuila
Flora of Chihuahua (state)
Flora of Sinaloa
Flora without expected TNC conservation status